Lumholtz may refer to:

Places
 Lumholtz, Queensland, a locality in the Cassowary Coast Region, Australia

People with the surname
Carl Sofus Lumholtz (1851–1922), Norwegian explorer and ethnographer, particularly indigenous cultures of Australia and Mesoamerican central Mexico
Nicolai Lumholtz (1729–1819), Danish-Norwegian bishop

See also
Lumholtz's tree-kangaroo (Dendrolagus lumholtzi) is a heavy-bodied tree-kangaroo found in rain forests of the Atherton Tableland Region of Queensland

de:Lumholtz